HarbourVest Partners is a private equity fund of funds and one of the largest private equity investment managers globally. The firm invests in all types of private equity funds, including venture capital and leveraged buyout funds, and also directly in operating companies.

Founded in 1982 as Hancock Venture Partners, a subsidiary of John Hancock Insurance, HarbourVest is based in Boston, Massachusetts with offices in Beijing, Bogota, Seoul, Tel Aviv, Tokyo, Toronto, London and Hong Kong.  HarbourVest has approximately 80 investment professionals globally and manages approximately $75 billion of investor commitments.

Investors in HarbourVest funds include various types of institutional investors such as public and corporate pension funds, endowments, foundations and financial institutions.

In 2001, HarbourVest Partners was inducted into the Private Equity Hall of Fame.

Investments
According to the companies SEC 13F-HR filing in August 2017, the companies investments included:
Lending Club
Acceleron Pharma
Box Inc.
Tesla
Groupon
Silver Spring Networks
Zendesk
U.S Auto Parts Network
Trevena
Wayfair

Secondary transactions
HarbourVest has completed a number of significant secondary market investments in private equity:

2008 - Macquarie Capital Alliance, in June 2008, announced a takeover offer from a consortium of private equity secondary firms including AlpInvest Partners, HarbourVest Partners, Pantheon Ventures, Partners Group, Paul Capital Partners, Portfolio Advisors and Procific (a subsidiary of the Abu Dhabi Investment Authority) in one of the first public to private transactions of a publicly traded private equity company completed by secondary market investors.
2007 - California Public Employees' Retirement System (CalPERS) agrees to the sale of $2.1 billion portfolio of legacy private equity funds at the end of 2007, after a process that had lasted more than a year.  The  buying group included Oak Hill Investment Management, Conversus Capital, Lexington Partners, HarbourVest, Coller Capital and Pantheon Ventures.
 2006 - American Capital Strategies sells a $1 billion portfolio of investments to a consortium of secondary buyers including HarbourVest Partners, Lexington Partners and Partners Group
 2003 - HarbourVest acquired a $1.3 billion of private equity fund interests in over 50 funds from UBS AG through a joint venture transaction

See also
Fund of funds
Private equity secondary market
Equity co-investment
Limited partner
HarbourVest Global Private Equity

References

External links
HarbourVest Partners

Private equity firms of the United States
Companies based in Boston
Financial services companies established in 1982
Private equity secondary market
1982 establishments in Massachusetts